Sandra (Sandy) Mewies AM (born 16 February 1950) is a Welsh Labour politician. Born in Brymbo, Wrexham, Mewies represented the constituency of Delyn at the National Assembly for Wales from her election in 2003 until 2016.

Education
Grove Park Girls' Grammar School, Wrexham. Holds a degree from the Open University and is an Honorary Fellow of the North East Wales Institute. She has worked as a journalist, in the voluntary sector running the former Clwyd Community Care Federation and as a lay inspector of schools. She is a former director of the Wales European Centre in Brussels.

Political career
County and community councillor, Wrexham for 16 years – she served as deputy leader and mayor.

She was elected to the National Assembly for Wales in 2003 as a Labour candidate to represent Delyn and re-elected in 2007 and again in 2011. She was Chair of the European and External Affairs Committee and sat on the Enterprise and Learning Committee.

References

External links
Sandy Mewies AM homepage
Website of the Welsh Assembly Government
Website of the National Assembly for Wales

 

1950 births
Alumni of the Open University
Living people
Councillors in Wales
Mayors of places in Wales
Wales AMs 2003–2007
Wales AMs 2007–2011
Wales AMs 2011–2016
Female members of the Senedd
Welsh Labour members of the Senedd
Women mayors of places in Wales
Women councillors in Wales